The 1999 Cherwell District Council election took place on 6 May 1999 to elect members of  Cherwell District Council in Oxfordshire, England. One third of the council was up for election and the council stayed under no overall control.

The result saw the Conservative party make gains from both Labour and the Liberal Democrats to become the largest party on the council.

After the election, the composition of the council was
Conservative 26
Labour 19
Liberal Democrat 5
Independent 2

Election result

References

1999 English local elections
1999
20th century in Oxfordshire